Bishop Hill State Historic Site is an open-air museum in Henry County, Illinois. It is located about 2 miles north of U.S. Route 34  in Bishop Hill, Illinois.

The Illinois Historic Preservation Agency operates four surviving buildings in the village as a state historic site located within the Bishop Hill Historic District, which was added to the National Register of Historic Places in 1970, and listed as a National Historic Landmark in 1984.

Bishop Hill was the site of a utopian religious community founded in 1846 by Swedish pietist Eric Janson. The settlers of Bishop Hill included skilled carpenters and craftsmen. Today visitors can enter the two-story frame Greek Revival-style Colony Church (1848), part of which was once used as single-room apartments by colony residents and which features a museum about Bishop Hill's history and reproductions of Colony artifacts, the three-story stuccoed-brick Colony Hotel  (1852-ca. 1860), the small two-story frame Boys Dormitory (ca. 1850), and the Colony barn (mid-1850s) which was relocated behind the Hotel to the site of the original Hotel stable. The state also owns the village park with a gazebo and memorials to the town’s early settlers and Civil War soldiers. A museum building houses a collection of early American primitive paintings by colonist and folk artist Olof Krans.

References

Related reading
Barton; H. Arnold  (1994)   A Folk Divided: Homeland Swedes and Swedish-Americans, 1840-1940   (Southern Illinois University Press)  
Lovoll, Odd S.  (1993)  Nordics in America: The Future of Their Past (Norwegian American Historical Association)

External links
Bishop Hill State Historic Site
Bishop Hill, Henry County, Illinois - detailed information on the site and photos
Bishop Hill Old Settlers' Association

Illinois State Historic Sites
Open-air museums in Illinois
Religious museums in Illinois
Art museums and galleries in Illinois
Museums in Henry County, Illinois
Swedish-American culture in Illinois